Maixi Township (Mandarin: 麦溪乡) is a township in Zoige, Ngawa Tibetan and Qiang Autonomous Prefecture, Sichuan, China. In 2010, Maixi Township had a total population of 5,323: 2,684 males and 2,639 females: 1,475 aged under 14, 3,485 aged between 15 and 65 and 363 aged over 65.

See also 
 List of township-level divisions of Sichuan

References 

Townships of China
Ngawa Tibetan and Qiang Autonomous Prefecture
Township-level divisions of Sichuan